The paramilitary forces of China are the military units and formations apart from the People's Liberation Army, the principal military force of the People's Republic of China. They are composed of three main forces, the People's Liberation Army reserve force, the People's Armed Police (PAP), and the Militia, and they act as auxiliaries to the active forces of the People's Liberation Army. They generally perform a wide range of roles. All together, the paramilitary has 20,854,000 troops, as of 2018.

People's Armed Police 

The Chinese People's Armed Police Force (PAP) is a paramilitary force primarily responsible for law enforcement, internal security, riot control and counter-terrorism during peacetime. In time of war, the PAP would  be used to support the PLA, especially in counter-insurgency operations. According to the constitution of the PRC, the PAP is one of three integral elements of the Chinese armed forces, along with the People's Liberation Army (PLA) and the militia and reserve forces. The China's National Defence White Paper published in 2006 claimed that the total strength of the PAP was 1.5 million people.

China Coast Guard

Militia 

The role of the Militia and the degree of party and PLA control over it have varied over the years. Nowadays, the Militia numbers some 3 million service men and women. During the 1940s the militia served primarily as a PLA support force. After 1949 the party consolidated control over the country and gradually used the militia to maintain order and help the PLA with defense of the borders and coast. In the mid-1950s Minister of National Defense Peng Dehuai attempted to build a reserve system incorporating the militia. 

Peng's efforts were thwarted when the party expanded the militia, assigning it duties as a production force and internal security force during the Great Leap Forward. Lin Biao reduced the size of the militia and reemphasized military training in the early 1960s. The militia was fragmented during the early years of the Cultural Revolution, but in the 1970s it was rebuilt and redirected to support the PLA. 

The Gang of Four attempted to build up the urban militia as an alternative to the PLA, but the urban militia failed to support the Gang of Four in 1976, when Hua Guofeng and moderate military leaders deposed them. The militia's logistical support of the PLA was essential during the Sino-Vietnamese War of 1979. In the 1980s Chinese leaders undertook to improve the militia's military capabilities by reducing its size and its economic tasks. when China was founded, CPC claimed a militia of 5.5 million.

In 1987 the militia was controlled by the PLA at the military district level and by people's armed forces departments, which devolved to civilian control at the county and city levels as part of the reduction in force. The militia was a smaller force than previously, consisting of 4.3 million basic or primary—armed—militia, and the 6-million-strong general or ordinary militia. The basic militia was made up of men and women aged eighteen to twenty-eight who had served or were expected to serve in the PLA and who received thirty to forty days of military training per year. 

The basic militia included naval militia, which operated armed fishing trawlers and coastal defense units, as well as specialized detachments, such as air defense, artillery, communications, antichemical, reconnaissance, and engineering units, which served the PLA. The ordinary militia included men aged eighteen to thirty-five who met the criteria for military service - they received some basic military training but generally were unarmed. 

The ordinary militia had some air defense duties and included the urban militia. Efforts were made to streamline militia organization and upgrade militia weaponry. By 1986 militia training bases had been established in over half the counties and cities in the nation.

The militia's principal tasks in the 1980s were to assist in production, to undergo military training, and to defend China's frontiers in peacetime. In wartime, the militia would supply reserves for mobilization, provide logistical support to the PLA, and conduct guerrilla operations behind enemy lines.

People's Liberation Army Reserve Service 
The 1984 Military Service Law stipulated the combination of the militia and the reserve service system. Military training for senior middle-school and college and university students commenced in 1984 as China sought to provide additional qualified reserve service officers. The reserve force consisted primarily of the militia and was organized into reserve-service divisions and regiments. 

In 1987 China began to make reference to the National Defense Reserve Force, which apparently consisted of reserve soldiers (including all militia, demobilized soldiers, and specialized technical personnel registered for reserve service) and reserve officers (including demobilized officers and soldiers assigned to reserve officer service, college and university graduates, and civilian officials and specialized technicians). The Reserve,  as of 2016, is made up of 510,000 reserve personnel of all ranks.

Production and Construction Corps 

Before the Cultural Revolution, the Production and Construction Corps was a paramilitary organization of 3 to 4 million people under joint government, party, and PLA control. The Production and Construction Corps was used in remote and unproductive areas to build roads, reclaim land, construct defense and water works, and operate mines, state farms, and industrial plants. A secondary role was border defense, and some units were armed with light infantry weapons. All received basic military training. 

Unlike the militia, Production and Construction Corps personnel were full-time and uniformed. The PLA took over the Production and Construction Corps during the Cultural Revolution, then civilianized it in the 1970s. In the 1980s the corps appeared to have been abolished except in Xinjiang. There it operated under regional party and government organizations, the Xinjiang Military District, and the Ministry of Agriculture, Animal Husbandry, and Fishery.

See also 

 Central Military Commission (China)
 List of countries by number of total troops
 Paramilitary forces of India

References

Citations

Sources

Further reading 
 Andy Bunk. Forgotten A look at the changing roles of the Chinese militia system in the Communist era from its inception to the present.

External links 
 People's Armed Police SinoDefence.com

Military of the People's Republic of China
Paramilitary organizations based in China
Government paramilitary forces